Ericodesma pallida is a species of moth of the family Tortricidae. It is found in Australia, where it has been recorded from Western Australia.

The wingspan is about 12.5 mm.

References

Moths described in 1945
Archipini